The football sporting event at the 1927 Far Eastern Championship Games featured matches between China, Japan and the Philippines.

Results

Winner

Statistics

Goalscorers

References

Football at the Far Eastern Championship Games
International association football competitions hosted by China
1927 in Asian football
1927 in Chinese sport